Gee is a Chinese, Pakistani, English or Celtic surname. In English, it may be derived from Gee Cross, Stockport, Cheshire, which was named after a Gee family, or from the French personal name Guy or from the word geai meaning "jay bird" referring to someone who was a "bright chatterbox". In Celtic origins, Gee may derive from the Scots/Irish Gaelic personal name Gee or Mac Gee (an Anglicised form of Mac Aodh (pronounced "ee") meaning ‘son of Gee (Hugh)").

People with the surname 

 Allen Gee (1852–1939), British trade unionist and politician
 Alonzo Gee (born 1987) American  basketball player
 Andrew Gee (rugby league) (born 1970), Australian rugby player
 Andrew Gee (politician) (born c. 1968), Australian politician from New South Wales
 Bobby Gee (born 1953), occasional spelling of singer Bobby G
Cara Gee (born 1983), Canadian actress
 Catherine Gee (born 1967), British television presenter
 Constance Bumgarner Gee, American scholar, memoirist, and medical cannabis advocate
 Darron Gee (born 1962), English football player and manager
 David Gee (disambiguation), multiple people
 Delbert Gee, American judge from California
 Dillon Gee (born 1986), baseball player
 Dolly Gee (born 1959), American judge
Dolly Gee (banker) (died 1966), American banker
 Dustin Gee (1942–1986), English comedian
 Edward Pritchard Gee (1904–1968), British naturalist
 Ethel Gee (1914–1984), British member of the Portland Spy Ring
 Franky Gee (1962–2005), frontman for the German pop group Captain Jack
 Gilbert Gee, American public health academic
 Gordon Gee (born 1944), American academic
 Grant Gee (born 1964), British documentary and music video director
 Hector Gee (1909–1987), Australian rugby player
 Henry Gee (born 1962), British paleontologist
 Henry Gee (dean) (1858–1938), English churchman and academic
 Herbert Leslie Gee (1901–1977), English writer
 James Paul Gee (born 1948), researcher in psycholinguistics
 Jon Gee (born 1960), Australian politician
 Joshua Gee (1667–1730), British merchant, publicist and writer
 Keith Gee, Australian rugby player
 Ken Gee (1916–1989), English rugby player
 Maggie Gee (disambiguation), multiple people, including:
Maggie Gee (novelist) (born 1948), English novelist
Maggie Gee (pilot) (1923–2013), American aviator
 Maurice Gee (born 1931), New Zealand novelist
 Paris Gee (born 1994), Canadian soccer player
 Peter Gee (1932–2005), British-born artist
 Prunella Gee (born 1950), English actress
 Rich Gee (1894–1968), American baseball player
 Richard Gee (judge) (1933–2017), Australian judge 
 Robert Gee (1876–1960), English recipient of the Victoria Cross
 Robin Gee, American dancer, choreographer, and film director
 Rosko Gee, bassist with bands such as Traffic and Can
 Rupert Jee (born 1956), business owner and television personality
 Spoonie Gee (born 1963), American rapper
 Sue Gee (born 1947), British novelist
 Tamara Gee (born 1972), American singer-songwriter
 Thomas Gee (1815–1898), Welsh preacher
 Tom Gee (1900–1984), American baseball player
 Valmai Gee (born 1971), Irish cricketer

See also
 Rupert Jee, business owner and television personality
 McGee (surname)
 Ji (surname)
 Zhu (surname)

References

External links
 DNA project for Gee